Vladimir Perišić (born 1976 in Belgrade)  is a Serbian film director.

From 1995 to 97 he studied film directing at the Faculty of Dramatic Arts, Belgrade, from 1997-99 Modern Literature at the University of Paris. He stayed in Paris and studied film from 1999 to 2003 at La Fémis (École Nationale Supérieure des Métiers de l'Image et du Son).

His 31 min. graduation film Dremano oko (2003) was selected for Cinefoundation at the Cannes Festival. Ordinary People (2009), co-written by Alice Winocour, was his acclaimed existentialist feature film debut about seven soldiers posted to an abandoned farm with little information except to shoot a couple of people they have never met. It won Best Film at the 2009 Sarajevo Film Festival (Relja Popović won the Best Actor award) and the Cineuropa Prize for Best European film in the Miami International Film Festival in 2010.

Filmography 
1996 Novembre
2002 Killhouse
2003 Dremano oko
2009 Ordinary People
2014 Bridges of Sarajevo

References

External links 
 

1976 births
Living people
Film people from Belgrade
Serbian film directors